As of 2019, there are sixteen biosphere reserves in Indonesia that are part of World Network of Biosphere Reserves, which consists of 686 reserves globally.

Biosphere reserves  
Betung Kerihun National Park
Bromo Tengger Semeru National Park including Arjuno-Welirang
Belambangan Biosphere Reserve
Giam Siak Kecil-Bukit Batu
Komodo Biosphere Reserve
Lore Lindu National Park
Mount Leuser National Park
Mount Gede Pangrango National Park
Rimba Raya Biodiversity Reserve
Saleh-Moyo-Tambora (Samota)
Sembilang National Park
Siberut
Taka Bonerate National Park
Tanjung Puting
Tojo Una-Una Togean
Wakatobi National Park

References

Biosphere reserves of Indonesia
Protected areas of Indonesia